Bitter Suites to Succubi is an EP by English extreme metal band Cradle of Filth. It was released on 22 May 2001, through the band's own Abracadaver label.

Content and recording 

According to frontman Dani Filth, Bitter Suites to Succubi is a "transitional mini album; essentially an EP", bridging the gap between Midian and Damnation and a Day while the band negotiated their label change from Music for Nations to Sony Records. It features six new compositions (two of which are instrumentals), but is bolstered to album-length with three reworkings of songs from The Principle of Evil Made Flesh ("The Principle of Evil Made Flesh", "Summer Dying Fast" and "The Black Goddess Rises") and a cover of The Sisters of Mercy's "No Time to Cry". It was the band's first release on their own Abracadaver label.

"Dinner at Deviant's Palace" features a recording of Paul Allender's son reading The Lord's Prayer played backwards.

This would be the last studio release to feature guitarist Gian Pyres and long-term bassist Robin Eaglestone.

Release 

Bitter Suites to Succubi was released on 22 May 2001 on the band's own record label Abracadaver. It reached number 63 in the UK Albums Chart.

The Special Edition features a teaser for the video for "Born in a Burial Gown" as ROM content, along with a trailer for Cradle of Fear and a "Gallery of the Grotesque" (containing the sleeve art). The Special Edition's track listing misspells "Scorched Earth Erotica" as "Scorched Earth Erotics". Early copies of the CD subtitled "The Black Goddess Rises II" with "Ebon Nemesis".

In October 2011 it was awarded a gold certification from the Independent Music Companies Association which indicated sales of at least 75,000 copies throughout Europe.

Reception

AllMusic described it as "a somewhat illogically tossed salad of Cradle of Filth tracks" and "uneven at best".

Track listing

Personnel 
 Cradle of Filth

 Dani Filth – vocals
 Paul Allender – lead guitar
 Gian Pyres – rhythm guitar
 Robin Eaglestone – bass
 Martin Powell – keyboards
 Adrian Erlandsson – drums
 Sarah Jezebel Deva – female vocals

 Guest/session musicians
 Kian Rulten-Allender – voice 
 Libitina Grimm – cello

 Technical

Doug Cook – producer, engineer, mixing
Ray Staff – mastering

Charts

References

External links 

 

Cradle of Filth albums
2001 EPs
Spitfire Records albums